Dagmar Lydia Orlamundt, née Hansen (1863–1939) was a Danish actress from Odense who made her debut when only 14 at Odense Teater. In the 1890s, she was engaged by the Casino Theatre in Copenhagen where she was particularly successful in comic parts, playing the title role in the farce Charley's Aunt. From the turn of the century, she performed in Copenhagen at Dagmar Teatret and at Folketeatret until her retirement from the stage in 1932.

References

1863 births
1939 deaths
People from Odense
19th-century Danish actresses
20th-century Danish actresses